Muse Rabile Ghod or Muse Rabile Got also known as or Col. Muse Rabile Goad; was a Somali military leader, colonel, minister and politician of the former Somali Democratic Republic.

History 
Muse born in Borama, Awdal, Somaliland and belongs to the Bahabr Muse (Bahabar Muuse), Mahamed 'Ase (Maxamed Case) section of the Gadabursi (Gadabuursi) or Samaron (Samaroon) clan. In his life he managed to become member of the Supreme Revolutionary Council (Somalia) and Somali Revolutionary Socialist Party, a Military Leader. He worked at many ministries during his life as a politician, he served his country as Minister of Labour & Sport, Minister of Transport, Minister of Health, Minister of Commerce or Trade, Minister of Livestock, Animal Husbandry, Forestry and Range, Minister of Public Works and Housing, Minister of Land & Air Transportation.

Minister of Health 
As a Minister of Healthy he contributed to the eradication of smallpox in Somalia. A paper published by the World Health Organization was released in August 1979 declaring the eradication of smallpox (Ciribtirka Furuqa) in Somalia signed and stamped by the Ministry of Health.

Below is a quote by the World Health Organization (WHO) acknowledging Muse Rabile God contribution to the eradication of smallpox in Somalia and consequently in the world.

A gallery below of the contribution to the eradication of smallpox in Somalia and images of Muse Rabile God.

Career 
 Part of Supreme Revolutionary Council (Somalia)
 Part of Somali Revolutionary Socialist Party
 Minister of Labour & Sports (1971–1973)
 Minister of Transport (1973–1974)
 Minister of Health (1976–1980)
 Minister of Commerce or Trade (1984–1985)
 Minister of Livestock, Animal Husbandry, Forestry and Range (1985–1987)
 Minister of Public Works and Housing (1987–1989)
 Minister of Land & Air Transportation (1989–1990)

Publications 
"The Hunters of Somalia," World Health, October 1979, Muse Rabile Goad

References 

Year of birth missing
Year of death missing
Gadabuursi
Somalian military leaders
People from Awdal